The Jackals of a Great City is a 1916 American silent drama film featuring Harry Carey.

Cast
 Harry Carey
 Stella LeSaint (as Stella Razeto)
 Jean Hathaway
 Hayward Mack

See also
 Harry Carey filmography

External links

1916 films
1916 short films
American silent short films
American black-and-white films
1916 drama films
Silent American drama films
Films directed by Edward LeSaint
1910s American films